The Imperial Palace Ingelheim is an important imperial palace erected in the second half of the 8th century in Germany. It served Emperors and Kings as a residence and place for governance until the 11th century. The palatinate complex is located in the cadastral area of Nieder-Ingelheim, 15 km west of Mainz, in district "Im Saal". It is located at a slope with a view of the Rhine plains. Impressive remains of the buildings of the palace have been preserved above ground to this day. The greater part of the complex is located foundation under ground and  archaeological excavations have been able to reconstruct the entire system of buildings.

Historical studies 
Initial studies in the Palatinate area took place middle of the 19th century. In August 1852 Cohausen reported about first smaller excavations. 1888-89 Paul Clemen joined with excavations. The German Association for Art Research started under the direction of Christian Rauch in 1909 with systematic studies. These studies had to be stopped with the outbreak of the First World War, but, Rauch had published preliminary reports on excavations, after which a 1931-32 model was made, which was viewed by 1975 in the image of a typical Carolingian palace. In 1960, the excavations were taken under the direction of Walter Sage by the Deutsche Forschungsgemeinschaft again. In 1963, Hermann Ament led the excavations, followed by further excavations in 1965 and 1968/70 by Uta Wengenroth-Weimann. Following an overall plan of excavation and reconstruction drawings of Walter Sage, Konrad Weidemann made another model of the imperial palace Ingelheim in 1975. Since 1995 there have been ongoing excavations in the Pfalz region. These studies aim to recapture, describe, and date the individual parts of the building and the overall topography and brought quite a few discoveries to light. For example, a gold coin and a belt tongue from the time of Charlemagne, as well as a high medieval warm air heating recovered. In addition, the latest excavation results were used to create last year  a new reconstruction model of the Palatinate Ingelheim, have been incorporated into the current findings.

References

Further reading 
 Günther Binding (1996). Deutsche Königspfalzen. Von Karl dem Großen bis Friedrich II. (765–1240). Primus-Verlag, Darmstadt .
 Holger Grewe (2004–5). Neue Ergebnisse zur Sakraltopographie der Kaiserpfalz Ingelheim. In: Archäologie in Rheinland-Pfalz. ISSN 1614-4627
 François Lachenal, Robert Boehringer (Hrsg.) (1974). Ingelheim am Rhein. 774–1974. Boehringer, Ingelheim.
 Hans Schmitz (1974). Pfalz und Fiskus Ingelheim (= Untersuchungen und Materialien zur Verfassungs- und Landesgeschichte. Bd. 2). Hessisches Landesamt für geschichtliche Landeskunde u. a., Marburg .

Ingelheim am Rhein
Romanesque architecture in Germany
World Heritage Sites in Germany
Ingelheim
Museums in Rhineland-Palatinate
History museums in Germany
Ingelheim